Medina Township is located North of Peoria, in Peoria County, Illinois, and in the Illinois River Valley (West of the river itself). As of the 2010 census, its population was 12,564 and it contained 4,993 housing units.

Medina Township changed its name from Franklin Township on an unknown date, but most likely in 1850.

Headquartered in Mossville, it is served by two schools: Illinois Valley Central School District #321, and Dunlap School District #323.

Geography

Demographics

References

External links
 Medina Township (medinatownship.org - official site)
 City-data.com
 Illinois State Archives

Townships in Peoria County, Illinois
Peoria metropolitan area, Illinois
Townships in Illinois